American Dreier Looping (formerly Montaña Infinitum ["Infinitum Mountain"] (2007-2014), Montaña Triple Loop ["Triple Loop Mountain"] (2014-2016) and Quimera ["Chimera"] (2017-2019)) is an upcoming roller coaster under construction at Indiana Beach in Monticello, Indiana.

Manufactured by Anton Schwarzkopf, it was originally purchased by showman Rudolf Barth in 1984 who operated it as Dreier Looping for 12 years on the German fair circuit.

After this, it was the main attraction in three major theme parks: first spending 2 years in Sunway Lagoon as Triple Loop Coaster, next, it spent 5 years in Flamingo Land resort as Magnum Force, and finally at its third and most recent location at La Feria Chapultepec Mágico, as Montaña Triple Loop. In 2017 it was renamed Quimera. In 2023, it will open at Indiana Beach as American Dreier Looping.

On September 28, 2019, the derailment of the last car at an approximate height of 33 ft (10 m) resulted in 5 injuries and 2 deaths. This accident was much like that of another Schwarzkopf looping coaster, Mindbender.

History
The coaster first operated as Dreier Looping in 1984. Dreier Looping was one of many massive Schwarzkopf traveling coasters to make its debut during this period of time, alongside units including the famed Alpina Bahn, Olympia Looping, Doppel Looping, and Thriller traveling coasters. Dreier Looping, which is German for "Triple Loop", also became the first roller coaster to feature three vertical loops. It was purchased by showman Rudolf Barth, and operated on the German fair circuit for 12 years. Dreier Looping made its last fairground stop in 1996.

The coaster was then purchased by the recently opened Sunway Lagoon in Malaysia, where it operated as Triple Loop Coaster; a complete English translation of the German name "Dreier Looping". It was also outfitted with a pink and white colour scheme. Despite its renovations to fit in at the park, it was placed for sale during the 1999 season and promptly removed.

Its next stop would be at the Flamingo Land park in North Yorkshire, England. They had bought the coaster in June 1999, and was rechristened as the Magnum Force. It adopted a white and red paint scheme, although much of the ride's taller portions were painted completely white, presumably to blend in with the skyline a little more. It was put up for sale in 2005 alongside Bullet, another Schwarzkopf looping coaster in the park, and both were promptly removed after the 2005 season. They were replaced by Kumali, which debuted the next year and primarily utilizes Bullet's site. As of 2020, the Magnum Force plot of land has remained empty.

Magnum Force would then be sold to La Feria Chapultepec Mágico in Mexico City, Mexico. In order to accommodate it, the park's existing Ratón Loco had to be relocated to the park's lower level. It was outfitted with a brand new yellow-white-blue paint scheme and rechristened Montaña Infinitum (Mountain Infinitum). Around 2014, it would be renamed Montaña Triple Loop (Triple Loop Mountain), and later Quimera in 2017, receiving another repaint in the meantime.

2019 accident
On September 28, 2019, the derailment of the last car at an approximate height of 33 ft (10 m) resulted in 5 injuries and 2 deaths. This accident was much like that of another Schwarzkopf looping coaster, Mindbender. This accident lead to government officials investigating the park, who found that design flaws and little-to-no maintenance on the ride were to blame. The coaster's track, supports, and trains had also deteriorated due to the coaster being run much faster than it was intended to be. On October 13, the Mexican amusement park authorities announced the indefinite closure of the park, and revoked their operational license. La Feria has since not reopened, but several companies have been in a bid to buy the park.

Future
In late 2020, Quimera was reportedly being carefully dismantled for relocation from La Feria. The park's Ratón Loco and several other rides had already been removed from the site some time ago. However, it wasn't until the days leading up to the announcement that individuals with inside knowledge had posted information online regarding Quimera's future, stating that it would find a new home at Indiana Beach in Monticello, Indiana. Rumors promptly began to circulate, but it was only days later, on November 24, 2020, that until Indiana Beach released a press statement confirming such. Alongside a used Polyp attraction, it was undergoing a complete refurbishment and is currently intended to open for 2023 (originally 2021).

On January 19, 2021, Indiana Beach announced that the new coaster would be placed in the gravel parking lot west of Steel Hawg.

See also
1986 Mindbender accident, for a similar accident in Galaxyland, Alberta, Canada

References

https://www.radioformula.com.mx/noticias/20191013/la-feria-de-chapultepec-anuncia-cierre-definitivo/

External links
Montaña Infinitum on Coasterpedia

Roller coasters in Mexico
Roller coasters planned to open in 2023
2007 establishments in Mexico
Chapultepec
2020 disestablishments in Mexico